Andys Skordis (born in Nicosia, 24 August 1983) is a Cypriot composer. Andys has been awarded with the Buma Toonzetters Prize 2012, earning the title of the best Dutch Contemporary composition for that year. He has received other awards and honors from Cyprus, The Netherlands, Indonesia, Korea, Iceland and U.S.A. At the moment he lives in Amsterdam.

Biography 
Andys Skordis studied Composition and Film Scoring at Berklee College of music, graduating in 2007 with Magna Cum Laude. He followed his postgraduate studies in Composition at the Conservatorium van Amsterdam, studying with Richard Ayres and Wim Henderickx, graduating in 2011 with Zeer Goed. Andys has also studied Karnatic music for 5 years with Dr. Rafael Reina at the Conservatorium van Amsterdam, Javanese gamelan with Elsje Plantema and Balinese gamelan at Indonesian Institute of the Arts, Denpasar.

He has composed over 70 works ranging from opera, symphonic works, ballet, chamber music, oratorio, music for dance and film scores. He has worked with ensembles such as Vocaallaab, Asko|Schönberg, International Ensemble Modern Academy, Third Coast Percussion group, Residentie Orkest, The Black Page Orchestra, Orkest De Ereprijs, Nieuw Ensemble, Omnibus ensemble, Synchronos, Cyprus Symphony Orchestra, Mousique Nouvelles and many more. His music was presented in festivals including Gaudeamus Muziekweek, Holland Festival, Unsafe and Sounds, Bali Arts Festival, ACC Symphony for Asia, CTM festival, Young Composers Meeting, 21st Review of Composers, Yo Opera and more.

His music finds inspiration in the primordial human nature, in ceremonial and mystical rituals from the world and from his personal experiences. He considers his music as a time sculpture that adopts form in the context it is performed. Besides composing, he is the guitarist of Monsieur Doumani.

Awards - selection  
 2007 Best Music Film - C.I.F.F
 2007 Best Contemporary Film Music - N.I.F.F
 2010 2nd prize for “Stin Vrysin ton Poion?”  - Cyprus Symphony Orchestra
 2011 Finalist for “Silkstone…are you ever going to shatter? - Orkest de Ereprijs
 2012 Buma Toonzetters Prize for ''The deeper you go...the deeper you go...the deeper you go...deeper you go...you go...you?’’ - Buma Cultuur & MCN
 2012 Finalist for “7 unceremonious occasions” - Gaudeamus Muziekweek
 2013 1st prize for “O Ippis…Tou Ippi…E Ippei…Poios Ippei?” - Cyprus Symphony Orchestra
 2016 International Competition for Piano Quintet for “17…why not 37?”, ISCM Korea and Asia Cultural Center
 2019 Currents Creative Partnership - Third Coast Percussion group
 2019 Fedora prize for education, Opera & Ballet - Co-Operative, Greek National Opera
 2020 Black pencil prize
 2022 Berlin Opera Prize

Selected works 
"Argos Sidiros" - Opera, 2021
"R.I.N" - percussion quartet, 2020
"U...ZU" - Septet, 2019
"In...Se..." - Opera for Gamelan, 2018
“Ra…Patsia…Ou” - Opera, 2016
“Ou…Da” - Chamber Ensemble and electronics, 2016
“E…Sou…A?" - Oratorio for Gamelan and Choir, 2015
“Kra…Ne” - Piano trio, 2015
“Ou…Patsia…Ra” - Opera, 2014
“An empty something…something empty…” - Large Ensemble, 2013
“Tir…Mbo” - chamber ensemble, 2013
“17…why not 37?” - piano quintet, 2013
“Ο Ιππής...Του Ιππή...Ε Ιππή...Ποιός Ιππεί;” - Ballet for Symphony Orchestra, 2012
“The deeper you go…the deeper you go…the deeper you go…deeper you go…you go…you?” -  Large Ensemble and 5 Soprano, (2011)
“So we commence…where?” - Piano trio, 2011
“7 unceremonious occasions” - Brass quintet, 2010
“...... - Στην Βρύσην των ποιών;” - Symphony Orchestra, 2010
"Extrasolar Voices in an Absentminded Land" - Oratorio for large ensemble and Choir, 2009

External links
Composer's own website
Music Information Center Cyprus
Toonzetters Prize 2012
Gaudeamus Muziekweek 2012
Composers 21
Bellasartes Mexico
CMMAS Mexico

Interview
Interview

1983 births
Living people
21st-century classical composers
Berklee College of Music alumni
Conservatorium van Amsterdam alumni
Cypriot composers
Male composers
Cypriot film score composers
People from Nicosia
21st-century male musicians